Brexit opinion polls may refer to:
 Opinion polling on the United Kingdom's membership of the European Union (2016–2020)
 Opinion polling for the United Kingdom European Union membership referendum
 Opinion polling on the United Kingdom rejoining the European Union (2020–present)